All Out Cricket was a monthly cricket magazine. Launched in 2002, it was founded by Matt Thacker and was edited by Phil Walker. The magazine had its headquarters in London. It was part of Trinorth Media.

In 2012 John Stern, former editor of The Cricketer, began to serve as editor at large of All Out Cricket.

In October 2017, after 157 issues, the magazine was published for the last time. The following month the team behind All Out Cricket revived Wisden Cricket Monthly magazine.

References

2002 establishments in the United Kingdom
2017 disestablishments in the United Kingdom
Defunct cricket magazines
Defunct magazines published in the United Kingdom
Magazines established in 2002
Magazines disestablished in 2017
Magazines published in London
Monthly magazines published in the United Kingdom
Sports magazines published in the United Kingdom